Purbeck District Council in Dorset, England existed from 1973 to 2019. One-third of the council was elected each year, followed by one year where there was an election to Dorset County Council instead. The council was abolished and subsumed into Dorset Council in 2019.

Political control
From the first election to the council in 1973 until its abolition in 2019 political control of the council was held by the following parties:

Leadership
The leaders of the council from 2009 until the council's abolition in 2019 were:

Council elections

1973 election
1976 election
1979 election
1980 election
1982 election
1983 election
1984 election
1986 election
1987 election
1988 election
1990 election
1991 election
1992 election
1994 election
1995 election
1996 election
1998 election
1999 election
2000 election
2002 election
2003 election
2004 election
2006 election
2007 election
2008 election
2010 election
2011 election
2012 election
2014 election
2015 election

By-election results

1997–2001

2001–2005

2005–2009

References

 By-election results

External links
Purbeck District Council

 
Council elections in Dorset
Purbeck District
District council elections in England